William David Hutchinson (June 20, 1932 – October 8, 1995) was a United States circuit judge of the United States Court of Appeals for the Third Circuit and a Republican politician from Pennsylvania.

Education and career

William was born in Minersville, Pennsylvania, graduating as valedictorian from Minersville High School. He received a Bachelor of Arts degree from Moravian College in 1954. He received a Juris Doctor from Harvard Law School in 1957. He was in private practice of law in Pottsville, Pennsylvania from 1958 to 1981. He was an assistant district attorney of Schuylkill County, Pennsylvania from 1963 to 1968. He was a county solicitor for Schuylkill County from 1969 to 1972. He was a Member of the Pennsylvania House of Representatives from 1972 to 1982, serving four terms. He was a justice of the Pennsylvania Supreme Court from 1982 to 1987.

Federal judicial service

William was nominated by President Ronald Reagan on June 26, 1987, to a seat on the United States Court of Appeals for the Third Circuit vacated by Judge Arlin Adams. He was confirmed by the United States Senate on August 5, 1987, and received commission on August 6, 1987. His service was terminated on October 8, 1995, due to death.

Death

William died of cancer on October 8, 1995, at the Johns Hopkins Medical Center in Baltimore, Maryland.

References

External links
 
 

1932 births
1995 deaths
Harvard Law School alumni
Judges of the United States Court of Appeals for the Third Circuit
Members of the Pennsylvania House of Representatives
Moravian University alumni
Justices of the Supreme Court of Pennsylvania
United States court of appeals judges appointed by Ronald Reagan
20th-century American judges
People from Minersville, Pennsylvania
20th-century American politicians